is a Japanese soup made with pork and vegetables, flavoured with miso. It is a more substantial version of miso soup, with a larger quantity and variety of ingredients.

Common ingredients
Butajiru is usually made by stewing thinly sliced pieces of pork, alongside vegetables, in dashi stock, and flavoured by dissolving miso.

Common additional ingredients include burdock root, konjac, seaweed, spring onions, daikon radish, carrot, tofu including fried tofu (aburaage), tubers such as potatoes, taro or sweet potato, and mushrooms such as shiitake and shimeji.

On rare occasions, mildly degreased (not crispy) bacon can be used in place of pork. Instant butajiru is also available.

Naming

The Japanese character for pig (豚) can be pronounced either as "buta" or as "ton" in Japanese. The name butajiru is said to be dominant in Western Japan and Hokkaidō, while the name tonjiru is said to be more common in Eastern Japan.

A version of the dish, containing sweet potatoes, as served to skiers in the ski resorts of Niigata Prefecture up until about 1960, is known as sukii-jiru ("skiing-soup").

References

Japanese soups and stews